Big Brother 2017, also known as Big Brother 18 and The United Kingdom of Big Brother, was the eighteenth series of the British reality television series Big Brother, hosted by Emma Willis and narrated by Marcus Bentley. The series launched on 5 June 2017 on Channel 5, and ended after 54 days on 28 July 2017. Rylan Clark-Neal continues to present the spin-off show Big Brother's Bit on the Side. The series, along with its spin-off, continues to air on 3e in Ireland, as part of a three-year deal between the Irish broadcaster and Endemol Shine Group. It is the seventh regular series and the nineteenth series of Big Brother in total to air on Channel 5 to date. The series received a 1.24 million average.

On Day 7, Arthur Fulford left the house for unexplained reasons. Sukhvinder Javeed also became the first housemate to voluntarily walk from the house through the front door during her husband Imran's eviction on Day 12. Kayleigh Morris and Lotan Carter were also removed from the house on Day 13 and Day 21 respectively for aggressive behaviour.

On 28 July 2017, Isabelle Warburton was announced as the winner of the series, having received 52.71% of the final vote, with Raph Korine as the runner-up after receiving 22.02%.

Production

Eye logo
The eye was released on 11 May 2017 and is formed with a multi-coloured Union Jack flag and features a patchwork of eclectic images representing modern Britain.

Teasers
On 12 May 2017, a short 5-second teaser trailer was released on Channel 5. On 20 May 2017 the first full trailer for the series was released. The trailer depicts various locations around Britain and is narrated by several different voices, as well as featuring distorted Union Jack-style graphics first used in the earlier 5-second teaser. It also includes clues on the identity of the housemates. On 27 May 2017, a third trailer was released, this time with blurred snippets of possible housemates, and teasing that this year Big Brother will be getting "extremely revealing." On 2 June, Channel 5 released images of 6 of the new housemates via Instagram and Snapchat.

House
House pictures were released on 31 May 2017; the House followed the theme of a "Big Brother Village". For the first time since Big Brother 11, the living room and the kitchen-dining room were separate. The kitchen was modelled after a bakery accompanied by four dining tables, each with four chairs. For part of the season, the chair at the centre of the Kenny/Shiells altercation was used as the diary room chair. Also, for the first time since Celebrity Big Brother 6, there were two bedrooms. The first bedroom, known as Rose Cottage, was luxurious while the second bedroom, referred to as Thorn Cottage, was grotty and rundown in comparison. The bathroom was mostly pink and featured the decor of a salon, with windows looking out towards the garden.

Housemates
On 2 June 2017, Channel 5 released the identities of the first six housemates. The remaining 10 housemates were confirmed as they entered the house on 5 June 2017. Some housemates has pre-existing relationships, but their relationship had no impact on the format of the game and those with such relationships were still individual housemates - the pre-existing relationship include sisters Deborah and Hannah, husband and wife Imran and Sukhvinder, mother and daughter Mandy and Charlotte, and colleagues Kieran and Rebecca.

On 19 June 2017, it was confirmed that three potentially new housemates will enter for a task, and that the housemates would get to choose two of them to become official housemates. The three hopefuls were Isabelle Warburton, Sam Chaloner and Savannah O'Reilly. Isabelle and Savannah were ultimately chosen by Chanelle, Kieran and Lotan to join the housemates.

On 28 June 2017, it was announced that four new housemates would be entering the Big Brother house. These included the three hopefuls Andrew, Simone and Sue from the "People's Housemate" twist from launch night, as well as Sam, who entered during a dating task on Day 16. These four entered the house on Day 25 as "Second Chance" housemates, but were not eligible to win. Instead they stole £15,000 from the prize fund, which will only be given to the "Second Chance" housemate who goes the furthest in the series.

With 22 housemates in total, this series had the largest number of housemates since the show's move to Channel 5.

The People's Housemate
As part of the launch night twist, the viewers were able to vote a final housemate into the house. This housemate would become the People's Housemate and would have great power over the house, including regular contact with the outside world. Tom was chosen over Andrew, Sue and Simone to become the People's Housemate.
On Day 1, Tom was told he would have to exile some of the housemates. To help him make this decision he took part in a live Facebook web chat. He chose to exile Arthur, Chanelle, Charlotte, Hannah, Lotan, Raph, Rebecca and Sukhvinder, and therefore made the remaining housemates Citizens. Exiled housemates were forced to live in the grotty Thorn Cottage, had to abide by Citizens rules and all faced the first eviction.
On Day 2, the public voted for rules for the exiled housemates to follow. Out of a selection, Tom then narrowed these down to three. These included making the Exiled housemates bow every time a Citizen entered the room, for Exiles to make Citizens food and drinks when requested and for Exiles to disclose all private conversations.
On Day 3, after a live link-up on Big Brother's Bit on the Side listening to viewers opinions, Tom made his final decisions on whom to grant citizenship to and whom to exile. He swapped Charlotte with Mandy, and Hannah with Imran. The remaining exile housemates then faced the first eviction.
On Day 5, after it was revealed that Imran and Mandy received the fewest votes during the eviction, Tom had to choose one of them to evict. He chose Mandy. This was his final decision as "People's Housemate" as afterwards he received regular housemate status.

House guests
On 12 June 2017, it was confirmed that celebrities would be entering the house for the next shopping task. It was revealed that these would be VIP guests, and for the housemates to win a luxury shopping budget they would have to cater to the VIP's every needs.

Weekly summary
The main events in the Big Brother 18 house are summarised in the table below. A typical week begins with nominations, followed by the shopping task, and then the eviction of a Housemate during the live Friday or Thursday episode. Evictions, tasks, and other events for a particular week are noted in order of sequence.

Nominations table

Notes

: On Day 1, shortly after entering the house "People's Housemate" Tom was asked to reward citizenship to half of his housemates, therefore exiling the remaining. He chose to exile Arthur, Chanelle, Charlotte, Hannah, Lotan, Raph, Rebecca and Sukhvinder. The housemates with exile status were told that their place in the house was at risk. On Day 3, Tom was given the chance to finalise his decision - and therefore swapped Charlotte with Mandy, and Hannah with Imran. The housemates left exiled faced the viewer vote for the first eviction.
: On Day 5, it was revealed that Imran and Mandy received the fewest votes to save. Tom then got to decide which one got evicted. He chose Mandy.
: On Day 7, during a task, Joe was given the punishment of giving a killer nomination. He chose Raph, therefore automatically putting him up for eviction.
: On Day 12, the VIP house guests were each allowed to grant one housemate immunity. They chose Lotan, Kieran and Raph.
: Although every housemate gave two nominations, as usual, Chanelle's, Ellie's, Hannah's, Joe's, Raph's, and Tom's second nominations were not revealed.
: Hannah, Isabelle, Lotan and Tom received the most nominations this week. However, on Day 21, as a punishment for the housemate's behaviour, Big Brother voided all nominations and put them all up for eviction.
: Throughout the week of this week's eviction, the voting figures were released on Big Brother's Bit on the Side allowing the public to know which housemates were, at the time in danger of being evicted. After the eviction, the final voting figures were released too, showing that Savannah was evicted with 36.32% with the most votes, followed by Isabelle with 26.95%, and Hannah with 11.9%. Behind her was Tom with 6.99%, Chanelle on 4.71%, Ellie with 3.26% and Joe not far behind on 3.22%. Charlotte also received just 2.35%, Deborah got 1.92%, Kieran had 1.57%, whilst Raph received the fewest with just 0.8%.
: On Day 25, it was revealed that the "Second Chance" housemates were immune and were automatically given the power to nominate. The other housemates had to earn the right to nominate via tasks. Hannah and Deborah earned this on Day 26. On Day 27, Raph and Ellie also earned the right to nominate.
: There were no nominations this week. Instead, starting on Day 37, the housemates took part in "The Hunt" - a series of challenges where the losers risked facing eviction. Chanelle became the first nominated housemate after being randomly targeted in the first challenge. Simone became the second nominated after being targeted by her fellow housemates in the second challenge. The third challenge claimed Isabelle as its victim after choosing herself to face eviction between her and Sam. Sue fell victim to the fourth challenge after being targeted by Chanelle, Isabelle and Simone.
: As Simone had the most votes to evict, she was evicted out of the backdoor in the early hours of Day 40. Later that day, Emma entered the house announcing that Isabelle had the fewest votes and was safe, whilst housemates had to choose to save either Chanelle or Sue. With only one out of ten housemates saving Sue, she was evicted.
: From Day 41, housemates competed in teams in "The Steal", stealing money from the prize fund. Members of the winning team will be faced with a dilemma to steal all of the stolen money for themselves, but in doing this would have to evict a housemate. As Andrew pressed the buzzer the fastest, he won the £18,900 and the eviction of a housemate of his choice. He chose to evict Sam on Day 44 however he will not leave the house until Day 47. Even though Sam lost his housemates status on Day 44 he was still eligible to nominate on Day 45. Owing to Sam's eviction, Andrew also became the highest placing Second Chance Housemate and won £15,000 and could stay until the final, even though he is not eligible to win.
: On Day 47, housemates nominated face to face for what they thought was an immediate backdoor eviction. They chose Hannah and Tom. As Tom and Kieran were tied with two votes each, the result went down to the previous public vote, where Tom was ultimately chosen. The two housemates were then told they had been fake evicted and moved to The Attic, where they were able to spy on their fellow housemates and ultimately decide which two would face the final eviction. They chose Charlotte and Isabelle. Charlotte received the most public votes and was evicted through the backdoor on Day 50.
: For the final week the public were voting for who they wanted to win, rather than to evict. Isabelle won with 52.71% of the final vote, whilst Raph was runner-up with 22.02%. Deborah was third with 14.02%, Tom was fourth with 9.34%. Kieran and Hannah were evicted on Day 52 with 1.32% and 0.59% of the final vote. These percentages reflect the overall vote share, and do not account for vote freezes; Isabelle won 70.53% of the vote between her and Raph to win.

Ratings
Official ratings are taken from BARB.

Controversy
On Day 12, during a hostile discussion between Chanelle and Kayleigh, Chanelle knocked Kayleigh’s drink off the table in her direction, which enraged Kayleigh to the point where she made threats of physical violence, which continued after being called to the Diary Room to calm down. The following day she was removed from the house because of her threatening behaviour. Chanelle was also given a formal warning for her behaviour.

On Day 20, housemates were given a task in which they had to put different labels with personality traits on the housemate which they thought suited them best. During the task, Lotan started bullying Isabelle and she said that he was a bad role model to his son, in a response to Lotan's insults towards her. This caused Lotan to get angry and throw his drink across the room, covering a few housemates which enraged Chanelle and Hannah. He then walked upstairs to the Diary Room with Tom to calm down, with many arguments were taking place in the house. Lotan then broke out of the Diary Room and returned to the house and was called back in several times, but refused. When returning to the Diary Room, Hannah and Deborah attempted to confront Lotan, as Ellie and Charlotte tried to intervene, which at this point security was sent into the house to defuse the situation. Ellie deliberately tried to provoke Hannah and Deborah into hitting her, all whilst being held back by Charlotte. She carried on this behaviour at the top of the stairs, screaming wildly. Deborah proceeded to run up the stairs to confront Ellie, as Ellie continued to provoke her by telling Hannah and Deborah repeatedly 'hit me'. Despite this Ellie received no formal warnings. Deborah then threatened to leave, but after a discussion with her sister Hannah, decided to stay. The next day it was revealed that Lotan had been removed from the house due to his threatening behaviour and comments made about housemate Isabelle.

References

External links

2017 British television seasons
18
Channel 5 (British TV channel) reality television shows